Gut River is a river, beach and small hamlet on an isolated stretch of south facing coastline in Manchester, Jamaica.

River
This is a mostly underground river, which springs forth in a deep clear pool

Beach
There is wading access along the river to the beach which is in the middle of Long Bay, Manchester, a mostly deserted 20 mile strip of black sand.

Hamlet
On the east bank of the river there is a commercial beach property (access 100J$ in 2006) with bar facilities, which can be busy at holidays, but is usually very quiet and provides access to both the beach and the mouth of the river without wading. On the west bank is a private property. There appear to be no more than ten properties in the hamlet.

Access
A very quiet coastal road joins these three rather isolated spots. Many years ago the road used only to be passable with 4WD vehicles but in 2006 the surface was in good order for ordinary cars.

See also
 List of beaches in Jamaica

References

External links
Aerial view
Photos: 
Panoramio - Photo of Gut River
https://www.flickr.com/photos/bithead/368681796/ 
Diving at Gut River Part 4 at picturesfromjamaica.com.

Beaches of Jamaica
Rivers of Jamaica
Geography of Manchester Parish